Happy hardcore, also known as 4-beat or happycore, is a subgenre of hardcore dance music or "hard dance". It emerged both from the UK breakbeat hardcore rave scene, and Belgian, German and Dutch hardcore techno scenes in the early 1990s.

History

Origins
The breakbeat hardcore rave scene was beginning to fragment by late 1992 into a number of subsequent breakbeat-based genres: darkcore (tracks embracing dark-themed samples and stabs), hardcore jungle (reggae basslines and influences became prominent), and 4-beat also known as happy hardcore where piano rolls and uplifting vocals were still central to the sound. DJs such as Slipmatt, DJ Sy, DJ Seduction, Wishdokta, DJ Dougal, and DJ Vibes continued to play and put out music of this nature throughout 1993/4 – notably Slipmatt through the SMD releases, Wishdokta as Naughty Naughty, and Seduction on the Impact label.

In mainland Europe, new beat and hardcore techno from Belgium had spread into Germany and the Netherlands, artists such as Paul Elstak, Marc Trauner, Praga Khan, Human Resource, and Frank De Wulf had both an influence on the early 1990s on the UK rave scene.

1990s growth
Happy hardcore as it had become known was starting to gain popularity alongside jungle during 1994 and 1995, often being hosted at major raves such as Dreamscape and Helter Skelter, and other events held at the Sanctuary Music Arena. Parties hosting this music on the south coast of England included Fusion (Portsmouth), Adrenalin (Southampton), and Tazzmania (Hastings).

A huge part of the spread of both jungle and hardcore in these early days was the creation and sale of cassette tape compilation packs by the rave promoters. These would often contain hours of music recorded live at the rave events and would be sold across the country from independent record shops and via mail order, with the music then finding its way into the car stereos of the ravers and the Walkmans of their younger siblings in the school yards. In London, the pirate radio station Dream FM would become the primary champion of the genre, and later Eruption FM.

The sound was also changing, tracks increasingly losing their breakbeats towards a stomping distorted 909 4/4 kick drum pattern, with more original vocal leads and stab patterns. DJs and producers that began to come through included Hixxy, Breeze, Force & Styles, DJ Sharkey, and DJ DNA, and tracks that started to define the genre included Heart of Gold, Pretty Green Eyes, Cloudy Daze, Sunshine after the Rain, Above the Clouds, Discoland, Love of my Life, Techno Wonderland, and Hardcore Fever. Throughout the mid-late 1990s, the compilation series Bonkers would be commercially popular and showcase the latest hardcore music. As a side note; Bonkers only really came into being due to the record label React showing interest in Toytown, and Hixxy and Sharkey blagging a compilation album deal instead.

2000s
In the UK, the scene received its own special on BBC Radio 1 called John Peel Is Not Enough (named after a track by CLSM) in 2004. The scene continued to expand, with compilations such as Clubland X-Treme Hardcore, and an ever youthful audience. In 2009, DJ Kutski hosted a show featuring hard dance and hardcore on Radio 1. After a brief decline after 2009, including the closure of labels, DJs such as Kevin Energy and Sharkey announcing their retirements, the rise of digital labels has helped to both re-energise both classic releases as well as new and upcoming artists including Fracus & Darwin.

Elsewhere at this time, this particular sound had found a new worldwide audience in places such as Australia, Ireland, Poland, Russia, United States, Hong Kong and Japan.

Happy hardcore compilations
 Bonkers
 Dancemania Speed
 Happy 2b Hardcore
 Clubland X-Treme Hardcore
 Hardcore Til I Die
 Ultimate Hard NRG & Hardcore
 Hardcore Euphoria
 True Hardcore

References

Bibliography

External links

 United States of Hardcore - UK based hardcore music website
 HappyHardcore.com - Hardcore music website and radio
 "Background Briefing: 5 October 1997 – Taming The Rave" – ABC Radio National
 "Hardcore Dance Music – What Is Hardcore Dance Music?" – BDWRekordings.com
 The world's #1 clubbing community site, voted "Best Website" at the 2008 Hardcore Heaven Awards

Hardcore music genres

British styles of music
Dutch styles of music